WJTI (1460 AM) is a radio station licensed to West Allis, Wisconsin, United States. The station serves the Milwaukee area. The station is owned by El Sol Broadcasting, LLC.

History
The 1460 kHz frequency signed on the air in 1950 with the WRAC call sign, licensed to Racine. The owner of the station purchased another Racine station, WRJN-FM in 1969, changing it to WRAC-FM. A year later, the FM station flipped to a rock-leaning top 40 format as WRKR, and in 1975, WRAC adopted that call sign, simulcasting their FM sister station.

It was also for a brief time WWEG ("The Country Egg") before returning to WRKR and again simulcasting the FM signal. Later, there was a short lived Spanish format.

The station switched calls to WBZN on October 14, 1987, simulcasting its sister station's new smooth jazz format. Both stations flipped to urban contemporary in June 1991, becoming WKKV.

The AM station broke away from the simulcast in November 1993, flipping to a Spanish-language format as WBJX. The year 2007 brought the current call sign, WJTI, and a new city of license, the Milwaukee suburb of West Allis.

On December 17, 2021, WJTI began stunting with Christmas music and launched a simulcast on new translator W273BQ (102.5 FM). The previous Regional Mexican format continues through former translator 97.9 W250BN, which is now fed via the HD3 sub-channel of WMYX-FM. On December 26, 2021, WJTI and W273BQ flipped to a smooth jazz format as "102.5 FM".

Translators

The sale of translator station W250BN to El Sol was completed in May 2014, with El Sol beginning to simulcast WJTI upon it over that month's Memorial Day weekend. Previously the station had independently been a translator of Wisconsin Public Radio's Ideas Network via WHAD (90.7) under the ownership of "Radio Power, Inc." , which moved the translator over the years up the Rock Freeway corridor from Beloit in an attempt to move it to Milwaukee in order to likely present a ready-made signal for a commercial operation to broadcast an HD Radio subchannel or AM signal over. The moves were questioned by the Federal Communications Commission, with a denial of a construction permit to the MPTV Tower in the Shorewood tower farm and an inquiry to Radio Power on their motives before the purchase by El Sol. Radio Power eventually was approved to transmit from the Hilton Milwaukee City Center tower in the downtown area, which is closer to the core Latino-American neighborhoods on Milwaukee's south side which WJTI serves than the Shorewood site.
On December 17. 2021, WJTI signed on translator station 102.5 W273DQ, which serves the Milwaukee market.

Previous logo

References

External links

Former WBJX Website
The only 'champion' for local Hispanic radio

JTI
Smooth jazz radio stations in the United States
Radio stations established in 1950
1950 establishments in Wisconsin